Robert John Hoos (August 19, 1876 – May 16, 1929) was the tax commissioner of Jersey City, New Jersey. He was the first president of the Jersey City Chamber of Commerce.

Biography
He was born on August 19, 1876,  to Edward Hoos in Jersey City, New Jersey. He died on May 16, 1929.

References

Tax commissioners
1876 births
1929 deaths
People from Jersey City, New Jersey